The Independent Lubricant Manufacturer Association (ILMA) was established in 1948 it is a members only trade organization that represents the interests of lubricant manufacturers. The word "independent" in the name indicates that Integrated Oil Companies (Big Oil) are not members however most of them are ILMA sponsors.

Further reading

External links
 ILMA website

Technology trade associations
Lubricants